The Tupolev Tu-22M (NATO reporting name: Backfire) is a supersonic, variable-sweep wing, long-range strategic and maritime strike bomber developed by the Tupolev Design Bureau in the 1960s. According to some sources, the bomber was believed to be designated Tu-26 at one time. During the Cold War, the Tu-22M was operated by the Soviet Air Forces (VVS) in a missile carrier strategic bombing role, and by the Soviet Naval Aviation (Aviatsiya Voyenno-Morskogo Flota, AVMF) in a long-range maritime anti-shipping role. As of 2021, before the 2022 Russian invasion of Ukraine, there were 66 of the aircraft in service.

Development

In 1962, after the introduction of the Tupolev Tu-22, it became increasingly clear that the aircraft was inadequate in its role as a bomber. In addition to widespread unserviceability and maintenance problems, the Tu-22's handling characteristics proved to be dangerous. Its landing speed was  greater than previous bombers and it had a tendency to pitch up and strike its tail upon landing. It was difficult to fly, and had poor all-round visibility. In 1962, Tupolev commenced work on major update of the Tu-22. Initially, the bureau planned to add a variable-sweep wing and uprated engines into the updated design. The design was tested at TsAGI's wind tunnels at Zhukovsky.

During this time Sukhoi developed the T-4, a four-engine titanium aircraft with canards. Tupolev, whose expertise is with bombers, offered the Soviet Air Force (Voyenno-Vozdushnye Sily, VVS) a massively updated version of the Tu-22.

Compared to the T-4, it was an evolutionary design, and thus its appeal lay in its simplicity and low cost. The Soviet government was skeptical about the need to approve the development of a replacement aircraft so soon after the Tu-22 had just entered service. The Air Force and Tupolev, in order to save face regarding the Tu-22's operational deficiencies and to stave off criticisms from the ICBM lobby, agreed to pass off the design as an update of the Tu-22 in their discussions with the government. The aircraft was designated Tu-22M, given the OKB code "Aircraft 45", and an internal designation of "AM". Their effort was successful as the government approved the design on 28 November 1967, and decreed the development of the aircraft's main weapon, the Kh-22. The T-4 itself would make its first flight in 1972, but was later cancelled.

US intelligence had been aware of the existence of the aircraft since 1969, and the first satellite photograph of the bomber was taken in 1970. The existence of the aircraft was a shock to US intelligence as Nikita Khrushchev, who had been the Soviet premier up to 1964, was adamant that ICBMs would render the bomber obsolete.

As in the case of its contemporaries, the MiG-23 and Su-17 projects, the advantages of variable-sweep wing (or "swing wing") seemed attractive, allowing a combination of short take-off performance, efficient cruising, and good high-speed, low-level flight. The result was a new swing wing aircraft named Samolyot 145 (Aeroplane 145), derived from the Tupolev Tu-22, with some features borrowed from the abortive Tu-98.  The Tu-22M was based on the Tu-22's weapon system and used its Kh-22 missile. The Tu-22M designation was used to help get approval for the bomber within the Soviet military and government system.

The Tu-22M designation was used by the Soviet Union during the SALT II arms control negotiations, creating the impression that it was a modification of the Tu-22. Some suggested that the designation was deliberately deceptive, and intended to hide the Tu-22M's performance. Other sources suggest the "deception" was internal to make it easier to get budgets approved. According to some sources, the Backfire-B/C production variants were believed to be designated Tu-26 by Russia, although this is disputed by many others. The US State and Defense Departments have used the Tu-22M designation for the Backfire.

Production of all Tu-22M variants totalled 497 including pre-production aircraft.

Modernization
An initial attempt at modernizing the Tu-22M, Adaptation-45.03M, based around modernising the aircraft's radar, began in 1990, but was abandoned before reaching production. In 2007, work began on a new radar for the Tu-22M, the NV-45, which was first flown on a Tu-22M in 2008, with four more repaired Tu-22Ms refitted with NV-45 radars in 2014–2015.

A contract for a full mid-life upgrade, the Tu-22M3M was signed in September 2014. The aircraft is to receive a further modified NV-45M radar, together with new navigation equipment and a modified flight control system. A new self-defense electronic radar suite is fitted, replacing the tail gun of the existing Tu-22M3. Much of the new avionics are shared with the upgraded Tu-160M2. , armament was planned to be enhanced by adding the new Kh-32 missile, a heavily modified version of the current Kh-22, the subsonic Kh-SD, the hypersonic Kh-MT, or the Kh-47M2 Kinzhal missiles. In 2018, deliveries of the Tu-22M3M were expected to begin in 2021.

On 11 May 2020, it was reported by TASS, citing anonymous sources in the military-industrial complex, that a test launch of a new hypersonic missile, not belonging to the Kh-32 family, was conducted from a Tu-22M3M. Reportedly, work on the missile was initiated several years earlier, and its test were expected to be completed "simultaneously with the work on the upgraded Tu-22M3M bomber".

A separate, simpler, upgrade program (SVP-24-22) was being carried out in 2018 by the company Gefest & T, based on avionics developed for the Sukhoi Su-24 attack aircraft, including a new computer, a new navigation system and digital processing for the aircraft's radar. The upgrade is claimed to greatly increase navigation accuracy and bomb delivery. A SVP-24-22-equipped Tu-22M underwent trials in 2009, and the program was moved into production, with deliveries after 2012.

Operational history

Soviet Union 

The two prototypes Tu-22M(0) were delivered to Long Range Aviation's 42nd Combat Training Centre at Dyagilevo (air base), near Ryazan, in February 1973. The aircraft began practice sorties in March. Within 20 days of the aircraft's delivery, the air and ground crew at the air base had received their type ratings; this was helped by their earlier training at Tupolev, the Gromov Flight Research Institute and the Kazan plant. In June that year, the aircraft were demonstrated to Soviet government officials, destroying tanks and armoured personnel carriers.

The Tu-22M was first unveiled in 1980 during the aircraft's participation in a major Warsaw Pact exercise. During the exercise, naval Tu-22M2s conducted anti-ship operations by mining parts of the Baltic Sea to simulate an amphibious landing. The exercise was extensively covered by the press and TV media. In June 1981, four Tu-22Ms were intercepted and photographed by Norwegian aircraft flying over the Norwegian Sea.

The first simulated attack by the Tu-22M against a NATO carrier group occurred between 30 September and 1 October 1982. Eight aircraft locked onto the U.S. task forces of USS Enterprise and USS Midway which were operating in the North Pacific. They came within  of the task forces. The reaction of the U.S. Navy was thought to have been restrained during this event so as to allow the observation of the Tu-22M's tactics. The bomber also made attempts to test Japan's air defense boundary on several occasions.

The Tu-22M was first used in combat in Afghanistan. It was deployed December 1987 to January 1988, during which the aircraft flew strike missions in support of the Soviet Army's attempt to relieve the Mujahideens' Siege of Khost. Two squadrons of aircraft from the 185th GvBAP based at Poltava were deployed to Maryy-2 air base in Turkmenistan. Capable of dropping large tonnages of conventional ordnance, the aircraft bombed enemy forts, bases and material supplies. In October 1988, the aircraft was again deployed against the Mujahideen. Sixteen Tu-22M3s were used to provide cover to Soviet forces that were pulling out of the country. The Tu-22Ms were tasked with destroying paths of access to Soviet forces, attacking enemy forces at night to prevent regrouping, and to attack incoming supplies from Iran and Pakistan. Working alongside 30 newly arrived MiG-27s, the aircraft also flew missions aimed at relieving the besieged city of Kandahar. The aircraft had its last Afghan operation in January 1989 at Salang pass.

The Tu-22M suffered from widespread maintenance problems during its service with the Soviet forces. These stemmed from poor manufacturing quality.  The engines and airframes in particular had low service lives. The Air Force at one point sought to prosecute Tupolev for allegedly rushing the inadequate designs of the Tu-22M and the Tu-160 into service. This was compounded by the government bureaucracy, which hampered the provision of spare parts to allow the servicing of the Tu-22M. With some aircraft grounded for up to six months, the mission-capable rate of the aircraft in August 1991 was around 30–40%.

Russia 

At the time of the dissolution of the Soviet Union, 370 remained in Commonwealth of Independent States service. Production ended in 1993.

The Russian Federation used the Tu-22M3 in combat in Chechnya during 1995, performing strikes near Grozny.

In August 2007, the Tu-22M and the Tu-95 began conducting long-range patrolling, for the first time since 1992.

On 9 August 2008, a Russian Tu-22MR reconnaissance aircraft was shot down in South Ossetia by a Georgian air defence Buk-M1 surface-to-air-missile system during the 5–day Russo-Georgian War. One of its crew members was captured (Major Vyacheslav Malkov), two others were killed and the crew commander, Lt. Col. Aleksandr Koventsov, was missing in action as late as November 2011.

On 29 March 2013, two Tu-22M3 bombers flying in international airspace made a simulated attack on Sweden. The Swedish air defense failed to respond. Two Tu-22Ms flew supersonic over the Baltic Sea on 24 March 2015. Two Tu-22Ms approached Öland in international airspace on 21 May 2015. The Swedish Air Force sent two Saab JAS 39 Gripen fighters to mark their presence. On 4 July 2015, two Tu-22Ms approached the Swedish island of Gotland without violating its airspace, followed by Swedish and other fighter aircraft.

In 2014, Russian aerospace expert Piotr Butowski estimated there were seven squadrons of Tu-22Ms in service, each with approximately 10 aircraft, stationed at three airbases; 40 at Belaya airbase in southeastern Siberia, 28 at Shaykovka airbase southwest of Moscow, and 10 at Dyagilevo airbase in Ryazan southeast of Moscow which serves as the training unit for the bomber.  With the removal of the aircraft's in-flight refueling capability due to the START I treaty, the Tu-22M's internal fuel capacity limits its operational range (combat radius unrefueled: 4,000–5,000 km (DIA), 3,360–3,960 km (CIA) estimate) from its home bases to only around Russia's immediate sphere of influence.

Syrian Civil War
On 17 November 2015, as part of the Russian military intervention in the Syrian Civil War, Russia used 12 Tu-22M3 bombers to hit targets in Syria, along with cruise missiles fired from the Mediterranean and Tu-95 and Tu-160 strategic bombers. 22–31 January 2016, Tu-22M3s reportedly conducted 42 sorties performing airstrikes in the vicinity of Deir ez-Zor. On the morning of 12 July 2016, six Tu-22M3 bombers carried out a concentrated attack using high-explosive ammunition on Daesh targets east of Palmyra, Al-Sukhnah and Arak. On 14 July, six Tu-22M3 bombers having taken off from their base airfields in Russia delivered another massive strike on the newly detected IS facilities in the areas east of Palmyra, as well as in Al-Sukhnah, Arak and the T-3 oil pumping station in the province of Homs. New raids were conducted on 21 July, 8 August, 11 August, 14 August 2016.

On 16 August 2016, the bombers began to fly missions in Syria using Iran's Hamedan Airbase.

Since late January 2017, six Tu-22M3s resumed airstrikes in the area of Deir ez-Zor to prevent capture of the city by jihadists and again in late 2017 to support a government offensive. In May 2021, three Tu-22Ms were temporarily deployed to the Khmeymim airbase in Syria. Tu-22Ms were again deployed in eastern Mediterranean in June of the same year for large RF Navy and Air Force drills.

Ukraine
On 15 April 2022, Ukrainian Defence Ministry stated Russia used Tu-22M3 bombers to strike targets in Mariupol for the first time since it has started its invasion to Ukraine. Earlier it was also reported, FAB-3000M-46 dumb bombs were reactivated in Russia for use with Tu-22M3 bombers to strike targets at Azovstal iron and steel works plant that became the last bastion for Ukrainian troops in the besieged city of Mariupol.

On 11 May 2022, a video emerged on internet showing a Russian Air Force Tu-22M3 bomber launching of two Kh-22 missiles at targets somewhere in Ukraine.

On 5 December 2022, Russian Air Force Tu-22M3 bomber, identified as RF-34110, was shown damaged as a result of a long-range drone attack by the Armed Forces of Ukraine against the Dyagilevo air base near city of Ryazan. Images on social media showed at least the engine outputs and the trailing edge of the stabilizers damaged.

Export

The Tupolev company has sought export customers for the Tu-22M since 1992, with possible customers including Iran, India and the People's Republic of China, but no sales have apparently been made. Unlike the Tu-22 bomber, Tu-22Ms were not exported to Middle East countries that were threatened by the US military presence in the region. During 1999, India signed a lease-to-buy contract for four Tu-22M aircraft for maritime reconnaissance and strike purposes, which came in IAF service during 2001. At the time, the aircraft were to be delivered with Raduga Kh-22 cruise missiles.

In January 2013, reports emerged that China had signed a purchase agreement for the production and delivery of 36 Tu-22M3s, under the Chinese designation of H-10, with many components to be manufactured domestically in China under a technology transfer agreement with Russia and Tupolev. Sales of the Russian-built Raduga Kh-22 long-range anti-ship missile and the fleet's intended use as a maritime strike platform have also been speculated upon. Rosoboronexport has reportedly denied any sales or negotiations with China regarding the Tu-22M.

Variants

Tu-22M(0)
 Earliest pre-production variant, 9 were produced.
Tu-22M1
 Pilot-production aircraft, 9 were produced in 1971 and 1972. Its NATO reporting name was Backfire-A.
Tu-22M2
 The first major production version, entering production in 1972, was the Tu-22M2 (NATO: Backfire-B), with longer wings and an extensively redesigned, area ruled fuselage (raising the crew complement to four), twin NK-22 engines (215 kN thrust each) with distinctive intake ramps, and new undercarriage with the main landing gear in the wing glove rather than in large pods. 211 Tu-22M2 were built from 1972 into 1983. The Tu-22M2 had a top speed of Mach 1.65 and was armed most commonly with long-range cruise missiles/anti-ship missiles, typically one or two Raduga Kh-22 anti-shipping missiles. Some Tu-22M2s were later reequipped with more powerful NK-23 engines and redesignated Tu-22M2Ye.
Tu-22M3
 The later Tu-22M3 (NATO: Backfire-C), which first flew in 1977, introduced into operation in 1983 and officially entered service in 1989, had new NK-25 engines with substantially more power, wedge-shaped intake ramps similar to the MiG-25, wings with greater maximum sweep and a recontoured nose housing a new Almaz PNA (Planeta Nositel, izdeliye 030A) navigation/attack (NATO ‘Down Beat’) radar and NK-45 nav/attack system, which provides much-improved low-altitude flight. The aerodynamic changes increased its top speed to Mach 2.05 and its range by one third compared to the Tu-22M2. It has a revised tail turret with a single cannon, and provision for an internal rotary launcher for the Raduga Kh-15 missile, similar to the American AGM-69 SRAM. It was nicknamed Troika ('Trio' or third) in Russian service. 268 were built until 1993.

 As built, the Tu-22M included the provision for a retractable probe in the upper part of the nose for aerial refueling.  The probe was reportedly removed as a result of the SALT negotiations, because with refueling it was considered an intercontinental range strategic bomber.  The probe can be reinstated if needed.

 Tu-22M3s used to attack targets in Syria underwent modernization, during which the SVP-24-22 specialized computing subsystems were installed on them, significantly increasing the accuracy of the bombing.
Tu-22M4
 The development of the "Izdeliye 4510" began in 1983. Modernization with the installation of new engines NK-32 (from Tu-160) and with a change in engine air intakes. Modernization of avionics by installing a new PNK, radar "Overview" (from Tu-160), EW complex. Expansion of the range of weapons: 3 Kh-32 or 10 Kh-15 (with placement on 6 internal and 4 external points of suspension) or UPAB-1500 with a television guidance system. In 1990, a prototype was built at the Kazan aircraft factory. Works in this direction were discontinued in November 1991. The prototype aircraft No. 4504 is in the museum exposition of the AB Dyagilevo.
Tu-22MR
 Several Tu-22M3s, perhaps 12, were converted to Tu-22M3(R) or Tu-22MR standard with Shompol side looking airborne radar and other ELINT equipment.
 Tu-22DP
 Tu-22DP (Dal'nego Perekhvata, long-range interception)/ DP-1 is a long-range interceptor project based on the Tu-22M2 (later on the basis of the Tu-22M3). R & D was conducted by the AN Tupolev Design Bureau together with GosNIIAS. It was assumed that the DP could also carry strike weapons.
Tu-344
 A canceled civilian supersonic aircraft based on the Tu-22M3, designed to carry . Developed by Tupolev Design Bureau (ANTK named after A. Tupolev) within the framework of conversion program in the second half of the 1990s.<ref>Under the signs of "ANT" and "TU" // Aviation and Cosmonautics. - 2000. - # 11.</ref> The development of the aircraft began in the 1990s with the emergence of interest and demand for supersonic business jets (SBJ). Since the creation of an aircraft from scratch requires a large investment, Tupolev Design Bureau decided to create an SBJ-class aircraft based on Tu-22M3. However, the project proved to be unpromising at the time, as the aircraft was supposed to be used internationally, but did not meet international environmental standards of the day.
Tu-22M3 with SVP-24-22
 Modernized Tu-22M3 of the Russian Air Force fitted with a new sighting and computing system SVP-24-22 Gefest, instead of the NK-45 Vakhta-2 complex. The SVP-24-22 includes a new and more powerful SV-24 onboard computer, UVV-MP-22 input-output device, flight information generation unit – BFI, aviation collimator indicator KAI-24, radio navigation system SRNS-24 with the A737 satellite receiver and the solid-state information storage device TBN-K-2 to save data of the navigation-targeting complex SVP-24-22 and of the flight recorder. 5 modernized aircraft entered service in 2015, 2 in 2017, 1 in 2018, 2 in 2019 and 2 in 2022.
Tu-22M3M
 Tu-22M3 for the Russian Air Force with engines from Tu-160M2 (NK-32-02), 80 percent of avionics are replaced or upgraded, including SVP-24-22 bombsights, a phased array NV-45 radar, GLONASS navigation system, modern digital glass cockpit and engine controls, electronic warfare countermeasures, and the ability to use precision air-to-surface weapons. The modernization also counts with installation of mid-air refueling equipment, removed from existing aircraft in 1979 under the SALT II agreement, that will significantly increase the combat radius of the bomber. The Russian Ministry of Defense intends to upgrade up to 30 aircraft out of approximately 60 Tu-22M3s currently in service to the advanced Tu-22M3M variant. Can carry 3 Kh-32 or 4 Kh-47M2 Kinzhal missiles. Service life will be extended to 40–45 years. On 16 August 2018, the first modernized aircraft was unveiled during a roll-out ceremony at the Kazan Aviation Plant. It performed its maiden flight on 28 December 2018. On 20 March 2020, the second modernized Tu-22M3M aircraft had its maiden flight.

Operators

 
 Russian Aerospace Forces
Russian Air Force – 63 are in service as of 2018.
 Olenya (air base)
 40th Mixed Aviation Regiment
 6952nd Air Base – Belaya (air base), Irkutsk Oblast
 Elements of 326th Heavy Bomber Aviation Division (HQ: Ukrainka)
 43rd Center for Combat Application and Training of Aircrew for Long Range Aviation – Dyagilevo (air base), Ryazan Oblast
 1st Instructor Heavy Bomber Aviation Regiment
 Shaykovka (air base), Kaluga Oblast
 52nd Heavy Bomber Regiment of the 22nd Guards Heavy Bomber Aviation Division

Former operators

 
 Russian Naval Aviation – Tu-22M3s of the Northern Fleet and Pacific Fleet were transferred to the Russian Air Force in 2011.
 Northern Fleet
 924th Maritime Reconnaissance Aviation Regiment – Olenya (air base), Murmansk Oblast (now 40th Mixed Aviation Regiment of Russian Long Range Aviation
 Pacific Fleet
 568th Composite Aviation Regiment – Kamenny Ruchey, Khabarovsk Krai
 
 Soviet Air Forces – aircraft were transferred to Russian and Ukrainian Air Forces after the dissolution of the Soviet Union.
22nd Guards Heavy Bomber Aviation Division
 200th Heavy Bomber Aviation Regiment – Babruysk, Mogilev Region, Byelorussian SSR
 260th Heavy Bomber Aviation Regiment – Stryi Air Base, Lviv Oblast, Ukrainian SSR
 326th Heavy Bomber Aviation Division
 132nd Heavy Bomber Aviation Regiment – Raadi Airfield, Estonian SSR
 402nd Heavy Bomber Aviation Regiment – Balbasovo Air Base, Vitebsk Region, Byelorussian SSR
 840th Heavy Bomber Aviation Regiment – Soltsy-2 (air base), Novgorod Oblast, Russian SFSR
 13th Guards Heavy Bomber Aviation Division
 184th Guards Heavy Bomber Aviation Regiment – Pryluky Air Base, Chernihiv Oblast, Ukrainian SSR
 185th Guards Heavy Bomber Aviation Regiment – Poltava Air Base, Poltava Oblast, Ukrainian SSR
 52nd Guards Heavy Bomber Aviation Regiment – Shaykovka (air base), Kaluga Oblast, Russian SFSR
 Soviet Naval Aviation
 5th Maritime Missile Aviation Division
 574th Maritime Missile Aviation Regiment – Lakhta air base, Arkhangelsk Oblast, Russian SFSR
 924th Guards Maritime Missile Aviation Regiment – Olenya (air base), Murmansk Oblast, Russian SFSR
 2nd Guards Maritime Missile Aviation Division
 5th Guards Maritime Missile Aviation Regiment – Veseloye, Crimean Oblast, Ukrainian SSR
 943rd Maritime Missile Aviation Regiment – Oktiabrske, Crimean Oblast, Ukrainian SSR
 33rd Center for Combat Employment and Retraining of Personnel Aviation VMF – Kulbakino Air Base, Mykolaiv, Ukrainian SSR
 540th Instructor-Research Maritime Missile Aviation Regiment

 
 Ukrainian Air Force and Navy inherited a large number of Tu-22M2/M3 bombers. 60 Tu-22Ms (17 Tu-22M2 and 43 Tu-22M3) and 423 Kh-22 cruise missiles were scrapped under the Nunn–Lugar Cooperative Threat Reduction agreement led by the US. The last bombers were scrapped in January 2006.
 13th Guards Heavy Bomber Aviation Division – Poltava Air Base, Poltava Oblast
 185th Guards Heavy Bomber Aviation Regiment
 22nd Guards Heavy Bomber Aviation Division – Stryi Air Base, Lviv Oblast
 260th Heavy Bomber Aviation Regiment
 Ukrainian Naval Aviation
 2nd Guards Maritime Missile Aviation Division
 5th Guards Maritime Missile Aviation Regiment – Veseloye, Crimea
 943rd Maritime Missile Aviation Regiment – Oktiabrske, Crimea
 33rd Center for Combat Employment and Retraining of Personnel Aviation VMF – Kulbakino Air Base, Mykolaiv
 540th Instructor-Research Maritime Missile Aviation Regiment
 1 Tu-22M3 in the Poltava Museum of Long-Range and Strategic Aviation
 1 Tu-22M0, 1 Tu-22M2 and 1 Tu-22M3 in the Ukraine State Aviation Museum.

Accidents and incidents
On 16 September 2017, a Tu-22M3 overran the runway at Shaykovka Air Base due to an aborted take off. The aircraft was written off. All four crew members survived without injury.
On 22 January 2019, a Tu-22M3 crash-landed after a training flight while attempting to make a landing at the Olenya Air Base near the city of Olenegorsk in Russia's Murmansk region. Three of the four crew members died in the crash. A video shows the aircraft making a hard landing, which instantly ruptured the airframe and detached the forward cockpit area.
On 23 March 2021, a Tu-22M3's ejection system malfunctioned, suddenly activating while still on the ground. The incident resulted in the deaths of three crew members and the hospitalization of a fourth. An official from Russia's Defense Ministry said that "due to the insufficient altitude for parachute opening, three crewmembers received fatal injuries upon landing." The aircraft was at Shaykovka Air Base undergoing engine start procedures.

Specifications (Tu-22M3)

See also

References
Citations

Bibliography
 
 Donald, David, ed. "Tupolev Tu-22M". The Complete Encyclopedia of World Aircraft. Barnes & Noble Books, 1997. .
 Frawley, Gerald. "Tupolev Tu-22M". The International Directory of Military Aircraft, 2002/2003. Aerospace Publications, 2002. .
Gordon, Yefim; Rigmant, Vladimir; Komissarov, Dmitri (1999). Tupelov Tu-22 Blinder Tu-22M Backfire: Russia's Long Range Supersonic Bombers. Hinckley, UK: Midland Publishing. .

 Kandalov, Andrei; Duffy, Paul (1996). Tupolev – The Man and His Aircraft: The Man and His Aircraft. Society of Automotive Engineers. .
 Taylor, J.W.R. (ed.) Jane's All The World's Aircraft 1980–81. London: Jane's Publishing, 1980. .
 Wilson, Stewart (2000). Combat Aircraft since 1945''. Fyshwick, Australia: Aerospace Publications. .
 The product «45-03». Technical manual.

External links

 Tu-22M3 page on airwar.ru 
 Tu-22M entry at Globalsecurity.org
 Tu-22M photos at Airliners.net
 Tu-22M2 Backfire, photos

Tu-0022M
1970s Soviet bomber aircraft
Twinjets
Low-wing aircraft
Variable-sweep-wing aircraft
Aircraft first flown in 1969